David City is a city in Butler County, Nebraska, United States. The population was 2,995 at the 2020 census. It is the county seat of Butler County. David City was founded in 1873 to serve as the county seat when county residents desired a more centrally located county seat than Savannah. Some of the notable buildings, located on E Street, were taken directly from Savannah and planted by Thorton B. Myers,John T. Myers, Lierle, and Thomas Wolfe.; thus, their initials are located at the top of each building: "TB Myers." “J.T Myers.” “Wolfe.” “Lierle”

Name
The origin of the name of David City is disputed. One source claims that David City was named after the first Governor of Nebraska, David Butler. Another source says that David City was named in honor of Phoebe Miles, whose maiden name was either "David" or "Davids," because she had deeded a large tract of land for the townsite on which the court house now sits. A third source indicates that David City may have been named for a "Mr. Davids," a relative of William Miles, who was part owner of the townsite, and that the "s" at the end of "Davids" was dropped for convenience. Because details are unclear, this third explanation may be just another version of the second explanation. On its official website, David City claims the second of these explanations as the official explanation of its name.

Geography
David City is located at  (41.254543, -97.126457).

Demographics

2010 census
As of the census of 2010, there were 2,906 people, 1,153 households, and 706 families living in the city. The racial makeup of the city was 96.1% White, 0.6% African American, 0.1% Native American, 0.7% Asian, 1.8% from other races, and 0.8% from two or more races. Hispanic or Latino of any race were 3.5% of the population.

There were 1,153 households, of which 30.6% had children under the age of 18 living with them, 47.0% were married couples living together, 10.5% had a female householder with no husband present, 3.7% had a male householder with no wife present, and 38.8% were non-families. 33.4% of all households were made up of individuals, and 18.1% had someone living alone who was 65 years of age or older. The average household size was 2.37 and the average family size was 3.05.

The median age in the city was 42.1 years. 25.9% of residents were under the age of 18; 6.4% were between the ages of 18 and 24; 21.2% were from 25 to 44; 24.8% were from 45 to 64; and 21.7% were 65 years of age or older. The gender makeup of the city was 47.5% male and 52.5% female.

2000 census
As of the census of 2000, there were 2,597 people, 1,082 households, and 641 families living in the city. The population density was 1,724.6 people per square mile (664.0/km). There were 1,203 housing units at an average density of 798.9 per square mile (307.6/km). The racial makeup of the city was 98.58% White, 0.15% African American, 0.15% Native American, 0.23% Asian, 0.12% Pacific Islander, 0.50% from other races, and 0.27% from two or more races. Hispanic or Latino of any race were 1.00% of the population.

There were 1,082 households, out of which 29.6% had children under the age of 18 living with them, 49.0% were married couples living together, 7.1% had a female householder with no husband present, and 40.7% were non-families. 37.2% of all households were made up of individuals, and 22.6% had someone living alone who was 65 years of age or older. The average household size was 2.31 and the average family size was 3.06.

In the city, the population was spread out, with 26.2% under the age of 18, 5.7% from 18 to 24, 23.2% from 25 to 44, 20.4% from 45 to 64, and 24.5% who were 65 years of age or older. The median age was 41 years. For every 100 females, there were 91.5 males. For every 100 females age 18 and over, there were 85.8 males.

As of 2000 the median income for a household in the city was $34,583, and the median income for a family was $48,098. Males had a median income of $28,185 versus $21,179 for females. The per capita income for the city was $16,550. About 3.1% of families and 8.1% of the population were below the poverty line, including 8.0% of those under age 18 and 10.1% of those age 65 or over.

Education

High schools 
David City has two high schools. The largest is David City Secondary School. Its athletic teams are the Scouts. The second is Aquinas High School. The Catholic school is named after Thomas Aquinas. Its teams are the Monarchs.

David City Public Schools 
David City Public Schools operates a secondary school and two elementary schools: Bellwood and David City.

Media 
David City has one newspaper, The Banner-Press. The newspaper is published once a week.

Notable people
 Ruth Etting – Singer of the 1930s, subject of Love Me or Leave Me
 Joyce Hall – Founder of Hallmark Cards
 Shon Hopwood – Bank robber turned lawyer and law professor
 Roman Hruska – Republican U.S. Senator, 1954–1976
 John Kirby – Professional football player
 Bob Martin – Football player
 Dale Nichols – Artist
 Hugo Otopalik – Iowa State wrestling and golf coach
 Kenneth Steiner – Roman Catholic bishop

References

External links
 David City website

Cities in Nebraska
Cities in Butler County, Nebraska
County seats in Nebraska
Populated places established in 1873
1873 establishments in Nebraska